Darryl John Maggs (born April 6, 1949) is a retired professional ice hockey defenceman who played 135 games in the National Hockey League and 402 games in the World Hockey Association between 1971 and  1980.

Career 
During his career, Maggs played for the Chicago Black Hawks, California Golden Seals, Chicago Cougars, Denver Spurs, Ottawa Civics, Indianapolis Racers, Cincinnati Stingers, and Toronto Maple Leafs.

Personal life 
He is the brother of Canadian poet Randall Maggs and the uncle of director Adriana Maggs.

Career statistics

Regular season and playoffs

External links 
 

1949 births
Adler Mannheim players
Calgary Centennials players
California Golden Seals players
Canadian ice hockey defencemen
Chicago Blackhawks draft picks
Chicago Blackhawks players
Chicago Cougars players
Cincinnati Stingers players
Dallas Black Hawks players
Denver Spurs (WHA) players
Ice hockey people from Saskatchewan
Indianapolis Racers players
Living people
Ottawa Civics players
SC Langnau players
Sportspeople from Saskatoon
Toronto Maple Leafs players